Bovie Medical Corporation  was an American medical device manufacturer of medical devices, electrosurgical products and energy technologies. It was based in Clearwater, Florida with a manufacturing facility in Bulgaria. 

In August 2019, the company sold off the electrocauterization portion of the business to Symmetry Surgical Inc. On January 1 2019, the company rebranded as Apyx Medical and was listed under the new ticker symbol APYX on the NASDAQ.

Company history
The company was found in Purchase, New York in 1978. Bovie Medical takes its name from Dr. William T. Bovie, an American scientist and inventor who is credited with inventing the electrosurgical generator in 1926.

Bovie went public in 1983 and is listed on the NYSE under the symbol BVX.

References

External links

Medical technology companies of the United States
Companies listed on NYSE American
Health care companies established in 1978
Health care companies based in Florida
Companies based in Clearwater, Florida
1978 establishments in New York (state)